The Four-man bobsleigh competition at the 2002 Winter Olympics in Salt Lake City was held on 22 and 23 February, at the Utah Olympic Park Track near Park City.

Records
While the IOC does not consider bobsled times eligible for Olympic records, the FIBT does maintain records for both the start and a complete run at each track it competes.

Prior to this competition, the existing track records for the Utah Olympic Park Track were as follows.

The following track records were established during this event.

Results

References

Bobsleigh at the 2002 Winter Olympics
Men's bobsleigh at the 2002 Winter Olympics
Men's events at the 2002 Winter Olympics